In computer network protocol design, inter-server communication is an extension of the client–server model in which data are exchanged directly between servers. In some fields server-to-server (S2S) is used as an alternative, and the term inter-domain can in some cases be used interchangeably.

Protocols 
Protocols that have inter-server functions as well as the regular client–server communications include the following: 
 IPsec, secure network protocol that can be used to secure a host-to-host connection 
 The domain name system (DNS), which uses an inter-server protocol for zone transfers; 
 The Dynamic Host Configuration Protocol (DHCP); 
 FXP, allowing file transfer directly between FTP servers; 
 The Inter-Asterisk eXchange (IAX); 
 InterMUD; 
 The IRC, an Internet chat system with an inter-server protocol allowing clients to be distributed across many servers;
 The Network News Transfer Protocol (NNTP);
 The Protocol for SYnchronous Conferencing (PSYC);
 SIP, a signaling protocol commonly used for Voice over IP;
 SILC, a secure Internet conferencing protocol;
 The Extensible Messaging and Presence Protocol (XMPP, formerly named Jabber).
 ActivityPub a client/server API for creating, updating and deleting content, as well as a federated server-to-server API for delivering notifications and content.
 SMTP which accepts both MUA->MTA traffic, as well as MTA->MTA, but it is usually recommended that different ports are used for these actions

Some of these protocols employ multicast strategies to efficiently deliver information to multiple servers at once.

See also
Overlay network

Internet Relay Chat
Network protocols

References